Pavol Strapáč (28 June 1957 – 29 December 2021) was a football player from Slovakia and former manager of MŠK Námestovo. He played ten seasons at ZVL Žilina as well as five seasons with NH Ostrava.

Managing career
Strapáč took up his first management position in the Czech Republic in September 2001 at FC Biocel Vratimov in the Moravian–Silesian Football League.

External links
 Pavol Strapáč official website

References

1957 births
2021 deaths
Slovak footballers
Slovak football managers
Slovak expatriate footballers
Czechoslovak footballers
MŠK Púchov managers
Association footballers not categorized by position